Cibo may refer to:

Cibo (artist), Italian antifascist street artist
Cibo (Blame!), fictional character
Cardinal Cibo (disambiguation)
Cibo Espresso, coffee franchise
Cibo family

CIBO, Channel Islands Brussels Office